The Argentine General election of 1954 was held on 25 April. Voters chose both their legislators and the Vice-President of Argentina; with a turnout of 85%.

Background
The death of his wife and closest advisor, Evita, stuck President Juan Perón amid serious difficulties. A severe drought in 1952 and years of pessimism in Argentina's important agrarian sector depleted foreign reserves and forced Perón to curtail public lending and spending programs. The recession (and a bumper crop) did, however, allow Central Bank reserves to recover and brought inflation (50% in 1951) to single digits.

Controversy surrounding Perón's in-laws and political violence both by and against his Peronist movement had dogged the president in the first half of 1953, and he took the opportunity of upcoming legislative polls to test his popularity. The Argentine Constitution did not require it at the time, but the President announced a special election to replace the late Vice President, Hortensio Quijano. Dr. Quijano had died on April 3, 1952, two months and one day before his term was to have ended on June 4, 1952. Perón nominated Senator Alberto Teisaire as the candidate for the then named Partido Peronista (Peronist Party).

Teisaire was familiar to Perón from the 1943 coup d'état; the former rear admiral had helped retain the normally restive Navy's support for the populist leader before and after Perón's 1946 election and, after eight years in the Senate, he remained close to the military - a far from trivial consideration.

In the opposition since 15 years before Perón took office, the centrist UCR had been burdened by censorship and sundry forms of harassment since 1930, and 1953 had been marked by the jailing of most of their leaders. Among the few prominent figures in the party available to run for the vice-presidency was Crisólogo Larralde. Larralde had opposed the UCR's 1945 alliance with conservatives and socialists against Perón, and was a well-known figure in the UCR's dissident, pro-Perón "Renewal Group." This did not, however, ease the UCR's restriction to access to most mass media, and the party was defeated by similar numbers to their 1951 loss.

Results

Vice president

Chamber of Deputies

Senate

Notes

1954
Argentina
April 1954 events in South America